Little Pioneer was a 1937 Warner Brothers/Vitaphone short subject.

Plot outline
In 1880 South Africa, young Betsy has an adventure involving Zulu tribesmen, Dutch settlers, the Voortrekkers, and her older brother's romance of Katie Snee.

Credited cast
Sybil Jason ....  Betsy Manning 
Jane Wyman ....  Katie Snee

Vitaphone short films
1937 films
Warner Bros. short films
American musical films
1937 musical films
1930s American films